Ireland was represented in the Eurovision Song Contest 2005 by the brother-and sister-act Donna and Joseph McCaul with their song "Love?", which written and composed by Karl Broderick.

Before Eurovision

You're a Star 2005 
You're a Star 2005 was the third edition of the talent contest You're a Star developed by RTÉ in order to select Ireland's entry for the Eurovision Song Contest 2005. The competition premiered with the auditions on 11 September 2004 and concluded with the final on 6 March 2005.

Format 
The contest took place over two phases. The first phases was the auditions where artists were able to apply by attending regional auditions between September and October 2004 in front of an expert panel. The panel consisted of RTÉ 2fm presenter Barbara Galavan, Deputy Chairperson of IMRO Dave Fanning and singer and songwriter Hazel Kaneswaran. 18 contestants were selected to proceed to the second phase, the live shows. The first show was the wildcard round which featured eight of the selected contestants competing for two places in the second show. From the second to the ninth shows, each contestant performed a song of their own choice and one was eliminated per show. From the tenth show and onward, the remaining three contestants performed their candidate Eurovision songs and one was eliminated before the final. During all live shows, the expert panel participated solely in an advisory role.

Auditions 
Artists were able to submit their applications for the contest by attending auditions across Ireland between 11 September and 16 October 2004 in the following cities and locations:

 11 September 2004 – Limerick
 18 September 2004 – Waterford
 25 September 2004 – Sligo
 12 October 2004 – Dublin
 16 October 2004 – Laois

Auditions were also open to residents of Northern Ireland, and group performers of six or less members were able to audition for the first time. From the auditions, 36 contestants were selected by the expert panel to take part in workshops where they received vocal and choreography training. From the workshops, the panel selected 10 contestants to directly advance to the live shows and 8 contestants to advance to the wildcard round.

Live shows 
The live shows aired between 2 January and 6 March 2005, all filmed at the Mahoney Hall of the Helix Centre in Dublin and hosted by Ray D'Arcy.

Results summary 
Colour key
  – Contestant received the most public votes
  – Contestant received the fewest public votes and was eliminated
  – Contestant was in the bottom two

Wildcard round

Elimination shows

Artist and song selection

At Eurovision
Because Ireland placed 22nd at the 2004 contest, Donna and Joseph were eligible to compete in the Eurovision semi-final. At Eurovision, Donna and Joseph remained in the middle of the stage while dancers added to their performance in the background. Eventually the dancers came to the front and did a well received Irish dance routine. The song did not manage to make it to the final, placing 14th in the semi-final.

The spokesperson who revealed Ireland's votes for other countries was Ireland's Eurovision Song Contest 1970 winner Dana.

Voting

Points awarded to Ireland

Points awarded by Ireland

References

2005
Countries in the Eurovision Song Contest 2005
Eurovision
Eurovision